Glory by Honor XII was the 12th Glory By Honor professional wrestling event produced by Ring of Honor (ROH). It took place on October 26, 2013, at the Frontier Fieldhouse in Chicago Ridge, Illinois. It was not aired live but it was taped for three episodes of Ring of Honor Wrestling.

Background
Glory by Honor XII featured seven professional wrestling matches, which involved different wrestlers from pre-existing scripted feuds, plots, and storylines that played out on ROH's television programs. Wrestlers portrayed villains or heroes as they followed a series of events that built tension and culminated in a wrestling match or series of matches.

The main event was titled a Champions vs. All Stars match, where by if any of the All Star team members pinned Adam Cole they will receive a future ROH World Championship title shot. Subsequently, Michael Elgin pinned Cole to win the match for his team.

Results

References

External links
Ring of Honor's official website

2013 in professional wrestling
Professional wrestling in the Chicago metropolitan area
2010s in Chicago
2013 in Illinois
Events in Chicago
12